Benjamín Macome (born 10 January 1986) is an Argentine rugby union footballer.

He plays for Tucumán Rugby in his homeland and the Pampas XV in the South African Vodacom Cup.

International career
Macome made his senior debut for Los Pumas in the 89-6 win over Chile on 20 May 2009.

References

1986 births
Living people
Sportspeople from San Miguel de Tucumán
Rugby union flankers
Rugby union number eights
Tucumán Rugby Club players
Pampas XV players
Stade Français players
Argentine rugby union players
Argentina international rugby union players
Argentine expatriate rugby union players
Expatriate rugby union players in France
Jaguares (Super Rugby) players